Marcel Alfred Reymond (or Raymond,  7 July 1911 – 4 October 2002) was a Swiss ski jumper who competed in the early 1930s. He won a gold medal in the individual large hill at the 1933 FIS Nordic World Ski Championships in Innsbruck.

References

External links 
 
 
 

1911 births
2002 deaths
Swiss male ski jumpers
FIS Nordic World Ski Championships medalists in ski jumping
Ski jumpers at the 1936 Winter Olympics
Olympic ski jumpers of Switzerland